Tertiapatus is an extinct genus of onychophorans known from Dominican amber deposits.  The only known species described is Tertiapatus dominicanus.

References

Prehistoric onychophorans
Onychophorans of tropical America
Onychophoran genera
Monotypic protostome genera
Prehistoric protostome genera
Taxa named by George Poinar Jr.